"Love Will Turn You Around" is a song performed and co-written by American country music singer Kenny Rogers.  It was released in June 1982 as the first single and title track from Rogers' album of the same name. It is also the theme song to Rogers' 1982 film Six Pack.  Rogers wrote the song with Thom Schuyler, David Malloy and Even Stevens.

The song was nominated for a Grammy Award for Best Male Country Vocal Performance. On the Billboard Hot 100 singles chart, the song reached No. 13, while reaching No. 1 on both the country and adult contemporary charts.

Critical reception
Kip Kirby, of Billboard magazine reviewed the song favorably, saying that Rogers "creates a sound similar to his First Edition work, with high-strung acoustic guitars backing a quick, unstrained vocal." He goes on to say that the song is notable for its "sharp metaphors on human relationships."

Charts

Weekly charts

Year-end charts

See also
List of number-one adult contemporary singles of 1982 (U.S.)

References

External links
Single release info at discogs.com

1982 singles
1982 songs
Kenny Rogers songs
RPM Country Tracks number-one singles of the year
Songs written by David Malloy
Songs written by Kenny Rogers
Songs written by Thom Schuyler
Songs written by Even Stevens (songwriter)
Song recordings produced by David Malloy
Songs written for films
Liberty Records singles